Alva Olsson  (born 1989) is a Swedish orienteering competitor She was born in Västerås. She competed at the 2013 World Orienteering Championships in Vuokatti, where she qualified for the sprint final. She won a silver medal in the relay at the 2014 European Orienteering Championships in Portugal, with the Swedish team.

References

External links
 
 

Swedish orienteers
Female orienteers
1989 births
Living people
Sportspeople from Västerås